Yijing or I Ching is a Chinese classic text.

Yijing may also refer to:

People
Yijing (monk) (635–713), Chinese Buddhist monk during the Tang dynasty
Yijing (prince) (1793–1853), Manchu prince of the Qing dynasty

Places in China
Shanxi
Yijing, Shenchi County, a town in Shenchi County
Yijing Subdistrict, Taiyuan, a subdistrict of Jinyuan District, Taiyuan
Yijing Subdistrict, Yangquan, a subdistrict of Chengqu, Yangquan
Yijing Township, Shanxi, a township in Ying County

Other provinces
Yijing Township, Anhui, a township in Changfeng County, Anhui
Yijing, Hebei, a town in Handan, Hebei
Yijing Station, metro station at Shenzhen, Guangdong

See also
I Ching (disambiguation)